Krasnousolsky (Krasnousol) is a rural locality (a selo) and the administrative center of Gafuriysky District in Bashkortostan, Russia. Population: 
The Krasnousolsk part of Krasnousolsky is a Spa town.

References

Notes

Sources

Rural localities in Gafuriysky District